Lukáš Dlouhý and Paul Hanley were the defending champions but decided not to participate. Bob and Mike Bryan won in the final against  Matthew Ebden and Jarkko Nieminen, 6–1, 6–4

Seeds

Draw

Draw

References
Main Draw

Apia International Sydney - Doubles
Men's Doubles